"Two turntables and a microphone" is the basic concept of a DJ's equipment. This phrase describes turntables (phonographs) and a microphone connected to a mixer. The DJ uses the mixer's crossfader to fade between two songs playing on the turntables. Fading often includes beatmatching. Live hip hop music also often has an MC rapping into the microphone. In nightclubs the microphone is usually used only for announcements.

In his autobiography, Jimmy Savile claimed to be the first person to use two turntables and a microphone, at the Grand Records Ball at the Guardbridge Hotel in 1947. Savile is acknowledged as one of the pioneers of twin turntables for continuous play of music, though his claim has been disputed. Twin turntables were illustrated in the BBC Handbook in 1929, and were advertised for sale in Gramophone magazine in 1931.

"Two turntables and a microphone" is the title of a 2008 documentary of the life of hip-hop DJ Jam Master Jay (Jason Mizell). The phrase is also featured in the chorus of the song "Where It's At" by Beck.

References

DJing
DJ equipment
IOS software
Jimmy Savile